Bela Bodnar (born June 30, 1952) is an American cross-country skier. He competed in the men's 30 kilometre event at the 1976 Winter Olympics.

References

External links
 

1952 births
Living people
American male cross-country skiers
Olympic cross-country skiers of the United States
Cross-country skiers at the 1976 Winter Olympics
Competitors at the 1972 Winter Universiade
Sportspeople from Fairbanks, Alaska
Wyoming Cowboys and Cowgirls athletes